Henry Charles Gordon (December 23, 1925 – September 24, 1996), (Col, USAF), was an American aeronautical engineer, U.S. Air Force officer, test pilot, and astronaut in the X-20 Dyna-Soar program.

Early life and education
Gordon was born in Valparaiso, Indiana, on December 23, 1925. In 1950 he earned his Bachelor of Science degree in Aeronautical Engineering from Purdue University, and in 1966 he earned his Master of Business Administration degree from the University of Southern California. He was married and had four children.

Test pilot
Gordon was in the Air Force, and flew combat missions in the Korean and Vietnam wars. He was selected as an astronaut in the X-20 Dyna-Soar program in April 1962 and began training at the Air Force Flight Test Center, Edwards Air Force Base, California.

He retired as an astronaut when the Dyna-Soar program was cancelled on December 10, 1963, having never flown in space. He remained in the U.S. Air Force after the Dyna-Soar program was cancelled and retired from the Air Force with the rank of Colonel.

Death
Gordon died in Peoria, Arizona on September 24, 1996, age 70.

References

External links

Astronautix biography of Henry C. Gordon
Spacefacts biography of Henry C. Gordon

1925 births
1996 deaths
American astronauts
American aerospace engineers
American test pilots
United States Air Force officers
United States Air Force personnel of the Korean War
United States Air Force personnel of the Vietnam War
American Korean War pilots
American Vietnam War pilots
Aviators from Indiana
People from Valparaiso, Indiana
Purdue University School of Aeronautics and Astronautics alumni
Marshall School of Business alumni
Engineers from Indiana
20th-century American engineers